Wax is an unincorporated community in  Grayson County, Kentucky, United States. The Wax Post Office closed in September 1994.

The community took its name from beeswax sold at the general store.

References

Unincorporated communities in Grayson County, Kentucky
Unincorporated communities in Kentucky